The Interns is a 1962 American drama film directed by David Swift and starring Michael Callan, Cliff Robertson, James MacArthur, Nick Adams, Haya Harareet and Suzy Parker. The film was followed by a 1964 sequel, The New Interns, and a 1970–1971 television medical drama series, The Interns, that was based on the films. The Interns was directed by David Swift.

Plot
A class of interns arrives for their first year in training at a public city hospital, which serves patients from many different ethnic and socioeconomic groups. Close friends and classmates John Paul Otis (Robertson) and Lew Worship (James MacArthur) plan to become surgeons and open their own clinic together. They are less than thrilled about their assignment to obstetrics, feeling that delivering babies is not very difficult.

Lew becomes romantically involved with student nurse Gloria (Stefanie Powers), while John becomes infatuated with fashion model Lisa Cardigan (Suzy Parker). Lisa dislikes the idea of dating a relatively impoverished young doctor, and is pregnant out of wedlock by another man. Although John offers to solve her problem by marrying her, she pressures him to illegally obtain pills for her in hopes of ending the pregnancy. He finally does so, and is caught and reported by Lew, ending their friendship and John's medical career.

Sid Lackland (Nick Adams) aspires to serve wealthy patients so he can make a lot of money. Then he becomes attached to Loara (Ellen Davalos), a girl from a poor village in Southeast Asia, who is one of his patients. She has a rare medical condition and is scheduled for a serious operation. Loara resists his friendly overtures because she is sure she will die in the hospital. Sid is heartbroken when Loara dies during her surgery.

Alec Considine (Callan) wants a residency under eminent psychiatrist Dr. Bonney, and secretly cheats on his wealthy fiancée Mildred (Anne Helm) with Dr. Bonney's longtime nurse Vicky Flynn in hopes of being introduced to the doctor. To keep up his medical duties and spend time with both women, Alec takes Dexedrine to stay awake. Although he does meet Dr. Bonney, who offers him a residency, Mildred discovers his affair and leaves him.

Madolyn Bruckner (Haya Harareet) aspires to become a surgeon under abrasive Dr. Domenic Riccio (Savalas). Despite her skills as an intern, Riccio discourages her because he is prejudiced against female doctors, assuming they will abandon their medical careers to get married and have children. Riccio later finds out Madolyn has already been married and has a child, yet is still pursuing her medical career as a single working mother.

At the end of the year, Alec, Lew, and several other interns come under suspicion when a terminally ill, immobile patient who has been begging to die is found dead of a barbiturate overdose. None of the involved interns can accept their residencies until the source of the drugs is found, creating a risk that the residency offers will be withdrawn. Alec, strung out on Dexedrine, has a nervous breakdown at the thought of losing his residency with Dr. Bonney. Lew and the other interns visit the patient's wife and find out that she gave him the drugs after being worn down by his constant pleas that if she really loved him, she would help him die. As a result, the interns are no longer under suspicion and can accept their offers.

Lew, having developed an interest in obstetrics after delivering a baby, accepts a residency at the same hospital, and convinces Gloria, who had planned to travel and see the world, to marry him, instead. Sid gets an offer from a wealthy hospital, but inspired by Loara, he goes to practice in impoverished Southeast Asia, instead. Riccio hires Madolyn as his resident assistant. John, now married to Lisa, visits his former classmates and tells Lew he respects him for his sense of ethics. A new class of interns arrives and Lew shows them the way to their dormitory, just as a doctor did for him the previous year.

Cast
 Michael Callan as Dr. Alec Considine
 Cliff Robertson as Dr. John Paul Otis
 James MacArthur as Dr. Lew Worship
 Nick Adams as Dr. Sid Lackland
 Suzy Parker as Lisa Cardigan
 Haya Harareet as Dr. Madolyn Bruckner
 Anne Helm as Mildred
 Stefanie Powers as Nurse Gloria Mead
 Buddy Ebsen as Dr. Sidney Wohl
 Telly Savalas as Dr. Dominic Riccio
 Katharine Bard as Nurse Vicky Flynn
 Kaye Stevens as Nurse Didi Loomis
 Gregory Morton as Dr. Hugo Grandchard
 Angela Clarke as Mrs. Emma Auer
 Connie Gilchrist az Nurse Connue Dean
 Ellen Davalos as Loara
 Carroll Harrison as Nurse Olga
 John Banner as Dr. Duane
 Mari Lynn as Samantha Simon
 Brian G. Hutton as Dr. Joe Parelli (as Brian Button)
 J. Edward McKinley as Dr. Robert Bonny
 Bobo Lewis as Gwen
 Ira Barmak as Second Intern
 Bill Gunn as Rosco (uncredited)

Production
The film was based on a novel by 26-year-old Richard Frede, who had worked as an intern for two years. It was published in 1960 and became a best seller. Film rights were bought for a reported $75,000 plus 15% of the profits. It was optioned by producer Robert Cohn who set up the project at Columbia.

Columbia offered the film to David Swift to direct. "it was the first property that had been presented to me and I thought I could make a fairly decent movie of it, a commercial script", said Swift. Among the changes Swift made was adding more comedy which "leavened the austerity and brutality of the hospital background", according to the director.

Robert Wagner had signed a three-picture deal with Columbia, and announced he would play the role of Lew. "This won't be another Dr. Kildare picture, with the standard romance and the other stereotypes, I can assure you", said Wagner. However his role ended up being played by James MacArthur.

Sidney Poitier was also announced for the cast but did not appear in the final film.

Reception
The movie originally ran for three hours but was cut down to two.

Box office
The film grossed $9,230,769 at the box office, earning $5 million in US theatrical rentals. It was Columbia's biggest grossing film of the year.

See also
 List of American films of 1962

References

External links
 
 
 
 

1962 films
1962 drama films
American black-and-white films
American drama films
Columbia Pictures films
1960s English-language films
Films based on American novels
Films directed by David Swift
Films scored by Leith Stevens
Medical-themed films
Films with screenplays by Walter Newman (screenwriter)
Films set in hospitals
1960s American films